Central Football Club is a Trinidad and Tobago professional football club, based in California, that plays in the TT Pro League. Founded in 2012, the Sharks were the 21st team to join the Pro League and plays its home matches in Ato Boldon Stadium located in nearby Couva.

History
Central FC was founded in July 2012, with the ambition to become a high achieving club on the pitch and an active club within its community. In the club's first season, Central completed twelve projects designed to promote football within the local community. Former Trinidad and Tobago international football player Brent Sancho was the Chief Executive Officer.

On 13 August 2012, former Arsenal and England international Graham Rix was named the club's first manager for their inaugural Pro League season. However, when Rix resigned after only five months and returned to his native England, the club appointed former San Juan Jabloteh manager and England international Terry Fenwick.

Inaugural season

Central FC began play in the 2012–13 TT Pro League season with their first match on 19 October 2012, against Police, which they won 1–0 following a goal from former captain Anthony Wolfe. The Sharks finished in a solid fifth position after their inaugural Pro League season having won eight from their 21 matches. However, the club's most significant accomplishment during their first season came in the FA Trophy after advancing to the final before losing 1–0 to Caledonia AIA.

Following the season, Central hosted a pre-season tour of Trinidad and Tobago for Football League One club, Walsall in July 2013. During the England club's visit, Central arranged for the Saddlers to visit four coaching schools and compete in three exhibition matches. The tour also provided four Central FC players a week trial with Walsall.

Players and staff

Current squad

Managers
  Graham Rix (2012)
  Terry Fenwick (2013–2014)
  Zoran Vranes (2014–2015)
  Dale Saunders (2016–2017)
  Stern John (2017–2020)

Honours

National
 TT Pro League
 Winners (3): 2014–15, 2015–16, 2016–17
 FA Trophy
 Runners-up (2): 2012–13, 2013–14
 First Citizens Cup
 Winners (2): 2013, 2014
 Lucozade Sport Goal Shield
 Winners (1): 2014

International
 CFU Club Championship
 Winners (2): 2015, 2016

References

External links
 Profile on Soca Warriors Online

 
Football clubs in Trinidad and Tobago
2012 establishments in Trinidad and Tobago
Association football clubs established in 2012